Santoshrao Vyankatrao Gode (29 August 1925 – 6 February 2000) was an Indian politician and a leader of the Indian National Congress party. He was a Member of the Parliament of India having been elected to the 6th Lok Sabha from Wardha Lok Sabha constituency in Maharashtra in 1977.

An avid agriculturist, he was also a member of several development committees and institutions namely-
1) Agriculture Produce Market Committee, Wardha, 1955—62,
2) Maharashtra State Road Transport Corporation, 1976–77,
3) District Development Board, Wardha, 1957—62,
4) Director, Maharashtra State Cooperative Land Development Bank Ltd., 1973—77,
5) Maharashtra State Irrigation Committee, Bombay, Founder-Member
6) Founder-Member - Mahatma Gandhi Institute of Medical Sciences
7) Founder-Member - Yeshwant Education Society, Wardha (Sevagram)

Gode gradually forayed into the political scene and held the following positions before being elected as the Member Of Parliament from Wardha.
1) Member Janapada Sabha, Wardha, 1953—62; 
2) President, Zila Parishad, Wardha, 1962—72; 
3) President, District Congress Committee, Wardha;  
4) Member, Maharashtra Congress Committee; 
5) Member, Committee on Subordinate Legislation.

Early life
Gode was born to Shri Vyankatrao & Manoramabai Gode at Kharangna Gode, Wardha District on 29 August 1925. He completed his graduation in Bachelor of Arts from Morris College, Nagpur University. He was married to Smt. Sindhutai Gode on 19 May 1952. They have three sons who are presently settled in Nagpur & Wardha.

Death
Gode died in Bordharan on 6 February 2000, at the age of 74.

References

1925 births
2000 deaths
Indian National Congress politicians
India MPs 1977–1979
Lok Sabha members from Maharashtra
People from Wardha district
Maharashtra district councillors